Territorial Council elections were held in the French overseas collectivity of Saint Martin on 20 March 2017.

Results

References

Saint Martin
Saint Martin
Elections in the Collectivity of Saint Martin
Saint Martin